Donkey-baiting is a blood sport involving the baiting of donkeys against dogs.

Donkey-baiting was quite common during the Victorian era, but was never popular with the masses.  This had less to do with not wanting to exploit the animal, but rather that the donkey offered little appeal, as it was rarely possible to make it attack the dogs.

See also

References

Further reading
Homan, M. (2000). A Complete History of Fighting Dogs. Howell Book House Inc. 

Baiting (blood sport)
Cruelty to animals